Willard Ross Laughon (29 January 1911 – 5 June 1999) was a double Navy Cross recipient submarine commander during World War II who reached the rank of captain in the United States Navy.

Early life
Willard Ross Laughon was born on January 29, 1911, in Princeton, West Virginia to Fred Thomas and Mattie Virginia Laughon (née Waddell). In 1929 he was accepted to the United States Naval Academy, and graduated in 1933.

Early military career
Upon graduating from Annapolis, Laughon was commissioned as an ensign in the United States Navy. His first duty assignment was aboard the  making cruises up and down the west coast.

In 1936 he married Alice Mellott of Salisbury, Maryland and was assigned to the Submarine School at New London, Connecticut.

World War II

On December 9, 1943, Laughon took command of the  based in Fremantle, Australia.

References

20th-century American naval officers
United States submarine commanders
1911 births
1999 deaths
United States Naval Academy alumni
United States Navy captains
Recipients of the Navy Cross (United States)
Military personnel from West Virginia
People from Princeton, West Virginia